Chris or Christopher Bell may refer to:

Chris Bell (American musician) (1951–1978), singer-songwriter and guitarist of the band Big Star
Chris Bell (American football) (born 1976), American football offensive tackle
Chris Bell, Australian musician, half of The Allen Brothers
Christopher Bell (businessman) (born 1957), British businessman
Chris Bell (poker player) (born 1971), American professional poker player
Chris Bell (politician) (born 1959), former US Congressman
Chris Bell (rugby union) (born 1983), rugby union footballer
Chris Bell (director) (born 1972), American director and writer
Christopher Bell (scholar) (1974–2009), disability studies scholar
Christopher Bell (racing driver) (born 1994), NASCAR driver
Christopher C. Bell (born 1933), American writer
Chris Bell (British Army officer), British Army officer